Hey Monday was an American rock band from West Palm Beach, Florida, formed in 2008. They released their debut album Hold On Tight in 2008, which produced the singles "Homecoming" and "How You Love Me Now". The album was followed up with their 2010 EP Beneath It All, which achieved moderate commercial success, and Candles EP in 2011. Their final release, The Christmas EP, was released on December 6, 2011. The band is on hiatus and claims to not be "broken up". Cassadee Pope has since released three studio albums as a solo artist and became the first female winner of The Voice.

History

Formation and Hold On Tight (2008–2009) 

Hey Monday was formed in March 2008 after Cassadee Pope and Mike Gentile's former band Blake broke up. Pope and Gentile wanted to continue playing music and began holding auditions for a new band around their local Florida music scene. Pope and Gentile quickly joined forces with drummer Elliot James who then recruited rhythm guitarist Alex Lipshaw. Soon afterward they enlisted bassist Michael "Jersey" Moriarty and Hey Monday was formed. They were discovered when Fall Out Boy's Pete Wentz heard one of their demos while he was in the Crush Management office. Wentz wanted to sign them to his label, Decaydance, but Columbia Records was also interested so the band ended up signing a joint deal with both labels. They recorded their debut album, Hold On Tight, throughout mid-2008 and it released on October 7 to very minor commercial success; it charted on Billboard Heatseekers albums. Soon after they began extensive touring with the Academy Is..., We the Kings, the Cab, This Providence, A Rocket to the Moon, VersaEmerge and Cash Cash. The following year they supported Fall Out Boy on both their major U.S. and international tours. Their popularity grew and the band went on their first headlining tour with This Providence, The Friday Night Boys, Stereo Skyline, and the Bigger Lights as support. They also headlined a few dates in Europe. In late-2009 they supported All Time Low on the Glamour Kills Tour.

Departure of Elliot James 
Following the band's headlining tour in the UK, James left the band. He went on tour performing with the group the Scene Aesthetic and reformed his former band Easton. At the beginning of 2012 Easton evolved into a new band, Break Blossom, which released a six-track EP, Last Night of Your Life, in May 2012, but the band split up six months later. James later launched a solo career, firstly releasing two singles in 2015 under the alias Baallet. Since 2016 he has released music under his own name, beginning with the EPs Soft Dreams Osaka (2016) and Favourite (2017). His debut solo album Always Lately was released in August 2019.

Beneath It All (2010)

Hey Monday spent the beginning of 2010 finishing the writing and recording of Beneath It All, which was originally going to be their second full-length studio album. After the writing and recording process, they went on the 2010 Alternative Press Tour with The Summer Set, Every Avenue, The Cab and NeverShoutNever. The band also played Bamboozle's Main Stage on Sunday, May 2. Hey Monday then played the entire Warped Tour 2010 on the Altec Lansing stage. The band performed two songs from Beneath It All on Jimmy Kimmel live on September 22, 2010, the lead single "I Don't Wanna Dance" and "Wish You Were Here". Although Cassadee Pope and Mike Gentile were the only official members of the band at the performance the fill-in musicians wore shirts with the absent band member's pictures on them. Hey Monday appeared in the fourth episode of the TV series Hellcats, called "Nobody Loves Me But My Mother".

Departure of Michael "Jersey" Moriarty
In 2010 following the band's performance at Warped Tour, the group announced that Jersey would be leaving the band. Mike Gentile's brother Chris then joined the band as bassist. Jersey is now doing a solo project and has released an EP named Oh Boy Here We Go.

Christmas EP and hiatus (2011–2018)
On February 8, 2011, Hey Monday re-released their second EP, Candles, digitally and a music video for "Candles" on March 9. "Candles" was used for a duet on Glee's episode Original Song done by Kurt Hummel and Blaine Anderson for a Regionals performance. In the spring of 2011, Hey Monday toured with All Time Low, Yellowcard, and The Summer Set on The Dirty Work Tour. In May 2011, Hey Monday played in Indonesia and went on a South American tour with Nevershoutnever that following August. In the fall of 2011, Hey Monday departed from the record labels Decaydance and Columbia. The band self-released The Christmas EP digitally on December 6, 2011, to iTunes and other digital outlets; it peaked in the top 10 of iTunes's Albums. On December 16 the band announced they were going on a hiatus. Pope went on to win the third season of NBC's The Voice. Mike and Chris Gentile also moved on to form Rescue Kid alongside Armando and Eddie.

Homecoming show (2019)
On November 25, 2019, after an eight year hiatus, Pope, Gentile and Lipshaw played an entire set as part of the “Hey, it’s Monday” Nashville pop punk show.

Musical style
Hey Monday has been described as pop punk, emo pop pop rock, and power pop.

Awards

Band members
Last lineup
 Cassadee Pope – lead vocals, acoustic guitar, violin (2008–2011, 2019)
 Mike Gentile – lead guitar, backing vocals (2008–2011, 2019)
 Alex Lipshaw – rhythm guitar, backing vocals (2008–2011, 2019)
 Chris Gentile – bass, backing vocals (2010–2011, 2019)
 Patrick McKenzie – drums (2010–2011, 2019)

Former members
 Elliot James – drums (2008–2009)
 Michael "Jersey" Moriarty – bass, backing vocals (2008–2010)

Timeline

Discography

 Hold On Tight (2008)

References

External links

 

Columbia Records artists
Decaydance Records artists
American power pop groups
Pop punk groups from Florida
American pop rock music groups
Rock music groups from Florida
Musical groups established in 2007
Musical quartets
Crush Management artists
Female-fronted musical groups